The 1963 Ohio State Buckeyes football team represented the Ohio State University in the 1963 Big Ten Conference football season. The Buckeyes compiled a 5–3–1 record.

Schedule

Coaching staff
 Woody Hayes - Head Coach - 13th year
 Lyal Clark
 Glenn Ellison
 Frank Ellwood
 Hugh Hindman
 Lou McCullough
 Harry Strobel
 Max Urick

Game summaries

Texas A&M

Indiana

Illinois

USC

Wisconsin

Iowa

Penn State

Northwestern

Michigan

Draft picks

Notes
† Pro Bowl Selection 
‡ Member of the NFL Hall of Fame

References

Ohio State
Ohio State Buckeyes football seasons
Ohio State Buckeyes football